Gendut Doni Christiawan (born 7 December 1978) is an Indonesian former professional footballer. He played as a striker for the club Persikota Tangerang until he was cut from their squad in September 2011. His brother, Nugroho Adiyanto, is a former PSIS Semarang defender.

Club career
He started his career in the 1998-99 season with his hometown team, PSIS Semarang, although he never played in the first-team. He moved to Persijatim Sriwijaya and was on the roster for two seasons but never played.

In 2002, he moved to the capital, Jakarta, to play with Persija Jakarta, where he recorded 23 appearances and scored one goal. This attracted the attention of other clubs, including Persikota Tangerang. He moved to Tangerang and remained there for two seasons, playing in 40 games and scoring 20 goals. His future looked bright, as one of the main strikers for the Indonesia national football team. He moved in 2004 to Persebaya Surabaya, but failed to impress—8 appearances and two goals—so he was sold to Arema Malang at the end of the season.

With Arema, Doni played sporadically: eleven caps and four goals. He remained with Persib Bandung in 2006, then, the same year, moved to lower-division Persitara Jakarta Utara, where, as the main striker, he played regularly and scored four goals.

International career
He earned 22 caps for the Indonesia national team, scoring nine goals, and appeared as the top-scorer in the 2000 Tiger Cup, with five goals, together with Worrawoot Srimaka.

International goals

|}

Honours

Country honors
 Champion of Asian Schools Championship : Indonesia U-18 (1996)

Club honors
 Champion of Liga Indonesia Premier Division : Persebaya Surabaya (2004)

Individual honors
 Asian Schools Championship Best player : Indonesia U-18 (1996)
 Tiger Cup Top Scorer : Indonesia (2000)

References

1978 births
Living people
Indonesian footballers
Indonesia international footballers
Association football forwards
Sriwijaya F.C. players
Persib Bandung players
Persiba Balikpapan players
Persija Jakarta players
People from Salatiga
Sportspeople from Central Java